Maroa may refer to:

Places
United States
 Maroa, Illinois
 Maroa Township, Illinois
Venezuela
Maroa, Venezuela
Maroa Municipality
New Zealand
Maroa Caldera

Entertainment
Maroa (2006 film)

Animals
Maroa (moth), the synonym of a moth genus in the family Crambidae